Paratamboicus is a genus of harvestmen in the family Sclerosomatidae from South America.

Species
 Paratamboicus albianus (Mello-Leitão, 1944)
 Paratamboicus aureopunctata (Roewer, 1953)
 Paratamboicus bicornutus Mello-Leitão, 1940
 Paratamboicus bogotensis (Roewer, 1953)
 Paratamboicus chilensis (Piza, 1942)
 Paratamboicus cinctus (Roewer, 1953)
 Paratamboicus citrinus (Pocock, 1903)
 Paratamboicus conspersus (Roewer, 1953)
 Paratamboicus dubius (Ringuelet, 1960)
 Paratamboicus formosa (Ringuelet, 1953)
 Paratamboicus geniculata (Mello-Leitão, 1938)
 Paratamboicus granulata (Roewer, 1912)
 Paratamboicus iguassuensis (Mello-Leitão, 1935)
 Paratamboicus insperata (Soares, 1972)
 Paratamboicus laevis (Ringuelet, 1960)
 Paratamboicus littoralis (Mello-Leitão, 1938)
 Paratamboicus luteipalpis (Roewer, 1910)
 Paratamboicus marmorata (Mello-Leitão, 1935)
 Paratamboicus marmoratus (Mello-Leitão, 1938)
 Paratamboicus metallicus (Roewer, 1953)
 Paratamboicus mexicanus (Roewer, 1953)
 Paratamboicus misionicus (Ringuelet, 1960)
 Paratamboicus nigripalpis (Roewer, 1910)
 Paratamboicus riedeli (Starega, 1970)
 Paratamboicus segadasi (Mello-Leitão, 1949)
 Paratamboicus tenuis (Roewer, 1953)
 Paratamboicus tocantinus (Roewer, 1953)
 Paratamboicus trochanteralis (Roewer, 1953)
 Paratamboicus unicolor (Loman, 1902)
 Paratamboicus unifasciatus (Roewer, 1910)

References

Harvestmen
Harvestman genera